New Britton is an unincorporated community in Delaware Township, Hamilton County, Indiana.

History
New Britton was laid out in 1851. A post office was established at New Britton in 1856, and remained in operation until it was discontinued in 1907.

References

Unincorporated communities in Hamilton County, Indiana
Unincorporated communities in Indiana
Indianapolis metropolitan area